An energy service company (ESCO) is a company that provides a broad range of energy solutions including designs and implementation of energy savings projects, retrofitting, energy conservation, energy infrastructure outsourcing, power generation, energy supply, and risk management.

A newer breed of ESCO includes innovative financing methods, such as off-balance sheet mechanisms. A range of applicable equipment configured in such a way that reduces the energy cost of a building. The ESCO starts by performing an analysis of the property, designs an energy efficient solution, installs the required elements, and maintains the system to ensure energy savings during the payback period.  The savings in energy costs are often used to pay back the capital investment of the project over a five to twenty years period or reinvested into the building to allow the capital upgrades that may otherwise be unfeasible. If the project does not provide returns on the investment, the ESCO is often responsible to pay the difference.

History

The beginning
The start of the energy services business can be attributed to the energy crisis of the late 1970s, as entrepreneurs developed ways to combat the rise in energy costs.  One of the earliest examples was a company in Texas, Time Energy, which introduced a device to automate the switching of lights and other equipment to regulate energy use. The primary reason that the product did not initially sell was because potential users doubted that the savings would actually rise. To combat this doubt, the company decided to install the device upfront and ask for a percentage of the savings that was accumulated.  The result was the basis for the ESCO model.  Through this process, the company achieved higher sales and more return since the savings were large.

Industry growth through the 1970s and 1980s
As more entrepreneurs saw this market grow, more companies came into creation.  The first wave of ESCOs were often small divisions of large energy companies or small, upstart, independent companies.  However, after the energy crisis came to an end, the companies had little leverage on potential clients to perform energy-saving projects, given the lower cost of energy.  This prevented the growth experienced in the late 1970s from continuing.  The industry grew slowly through the 1970s and 1980s, spurred by specialist firms such as Hospital Efficiency Corporation (HEC Inc.), established in 1982 to focus on the energy intensive medical sector. HEC Inc., later renamed Select Energy Services, was acquired in 1990 by Northeast Utilities, and sold in 2006 to Ameresco.

The 1990s: Utilities and consolidated energy companies become the major players
With the rising cost of energy and the availability of efficiency technologies in lighting, HVAC (heating, ventilation and air conditioning), and building energy management, ESCO projects became much more commonplace.  The term ESCO has also become more widely known among potential clients looking to upgrade their building systems that are either outdated and need to be replaced, or for campus and district energy plant upgrades.

With deregulation in the U.S. energy markets in the 1990s, the energy services business experienced a rapid rise. Utilities, which for decades enjoyed the shelter of monopolies with guaranteed returns on power plant investments, now had to compete to supply power to many of their largest customers. They now looked to energy services as a potential new business line to retain their existing large customers. Also, with the new opportunities on the supply side, many energy services companies (ESCOs) started to expand into the generation market, building district power plants or including cogeneration facilities within efficiency projects. For example, in November 1996 BGA, Inc., formerly a privately held, regional energy performance contracting and consulting company was acquired by TECO Energy, and in 2004 was acquired by Chevron Corporation. In 1998, BGA entered the District Energy Plant business, completing construction on the first 3rd-party owned and operated district cooling plant in Florida.

Decade of the 2000s: Consolidation, exit of many utilities
In the wake of the Enron collapse in 2001, and the sputtering or reverse of deregulation efforts, many utilities shut down or sold their energy services businesses. There was a significant consolidation among the remaining independent firms. According to the industry group NAESCO, revenues of ESCOs in the U.S. grew by 22% in 2006, reaching $3.6 billion.

ESCO operating principles

Introduction 
An energy service company (ESCO) is a company that provides comprehensive energy solutions to its customers, including auditing, redesigning and implementing changes to the ways the customer consumes energy, the main goal being improved efficiency. Other possible services provided include energy infrastructure outsourcing, energy supply, financing and risk management. It is this comprehensiveness of services that differentiates an ESCO from a common energy company, whose main business is solely providing energy to its customers. Typically compensation to the ESCO is performance based so that the benefits of improved energy efficiency are shared between the client and the ESCO.

ESCOs often use performance contracting, meaning that if the project does not provide returns on the investment, the ESCO is responsible to pay the difference, thus assuring their clients of the energy and cost savings. Therefore, ESCOs are fundamentally different from consulting engineers and equipment contractors: the former are typically paid for their advice, whereas the latter are paid for the equipment, and neither accept any project risk. The risk-free nature of the service the ESCOs provide offers a convincing incentive for their clients to invest.

Some typical characteristic of ESCOs are as follows:
 Ownership – ESCOs may be privately owned companies, either independent or part of a large conglomerate, state-owned, nonprofits, joint ventures, manufacturers or manufacturers' subsidiaries.
 Clients – ESCOs typically specialize on market niches by sector (industries, utilities, real estate, etc.) and by size (large or small projects). 
 Technology – Some ESCOs have a technological specialization (e.g. lighting, HVAC, a particular industrial process) whereas others are aim for a holistic approach.
 Project financing – Financing capabilities vary with the financial situation of the ESCO. Some have large parent companies, which allows them to self-finance projects. However, all ESCOs rely to some extent on third-party financing.

Developing a project
The energy savings project often begins with the development of ideas that would generate energy savings, and in turn, cost savings.  This task is usually the responsibility of the ESCO.  The ESCO often approaches a potential client with a proposal of an energy savings project and a performance contract.  This ESCO is said to “drive” the project.  Once the owner is aware of the possibility of an energy savings project, he or she may choose to place it out for bid, or just stick with the original ESCO.  During the initial period of research and investigation, an energy auditor from the ESCO surveys the site and reviews the project's systems to determine areas where cost savings are feasible, usually free of charge to the client.  This is the energy audit, and the phase is often referred to as the feasibility study.  A hypothesis of the potential project is developed by the client and the auditor, and then the ESCO's engineering development team expands upon and compiles solutions.

This next phase is referred to as the engineering and design phase, which further defines the project and can provide more firm cost and savings estimates.  The engineers are responsible for creating cost-effective measures to obtain the highest potential of energy savings.  These measures can range from highly efficient lighting and heating/air conditioning upgrades, to more productive motors with variable speed drives and centralized energy management systems.  There is a wide array of measures that can produce large energy savings.

Once the project has been developed and a performance contract signed, the construction or implementation phase begins.  Following the completion of this phase, the monitoring and maintenance or Measurement and Verification (M & V) phase begins.  This phase is the verification of the pre-construction calculations and is used to determine the actual cost savings.  This phase is not always included in the performance contract.  In fact, there are three options the owner must consider during the performance contract review. These options are, from least to most expensive:
No warranty other than that provided on the equipment.
ESCO provided M & V to show the projected energy savings during the short term following completion.
ESCO provided M & V to show the projected energy savings during the entire payback period.

A typical transaction involves the ESCO borrowing cash to purchase equipment or to implement energy-savings for its clients.  The client pays the ESCO its regular energy cost (or a large fraction of it), but the energy savings enable the ESCO to pay only a fraction of that to their energy supplier.  The difference goes to pay the interest on the loan and to profit.  Typically, ESCOs are able to implement and finance the efficiency improvements better than their client company could by itself.

Choosing an ESCO
Once the project has been defined, but before much of the engineering work has been completed, it may be necessary to choose an ESCO by putting the project “out to bid”.  This is usually the case when the client has developed the project on his or her own or is required to allow others to bid on the work as required by the government.  The latter is the case on any state or federally funded project.  The typical process includes a Request for qualifications (RFQ) in which the interested ESCO's submit their corporate resumes, business profiles, experience, and initial plan.  Once received, the client creates a “short list” of 3-5 companies.  This list is of the companies whose profile for the project best matches with the owners’ ideas in the RFQ.  The client then asks for a Request for Proposal (RFP) that is a much more detailed explanation of the project.  This document contains all cost savings measures, products, M & V plans, and the performance contract.  The client often allows a minimum of six weeks to compile the information before having it submitted.  Once submitted, the Proposals are then reviewed by the client, who may conduct interviews with the applicants. The client then selects the ESCO that presents the best possible solution to the energy project, as determined by the client.  A good ESCO will help the owner put all the pieces together from start to finish.  According to the Energy Services Coalition,

“A qualified ESCO can help you put the pieces together:
Identify and evaluate energy-saving opportunities;
Develop engineering designs and specifications;
Manage the project from design to installation to monitoring;
Arrange for financing;
Train your staff and provide ongoing maintenance services; and
Guarantee that savings will cover all project costs.”

Energy savings tracking methods
After installing energy conservation measures (ECMs), ESCOs often determine the energy savings resulting from the project and present the savings results to their customers. A common way to calculate energy savings is to measure the flows of energy associated with the ECM, and then to apply spreadsheet calculations to determine savings. For example, a chiller retrofit would require measurements of chilled water supply and return temperatures and kW. The benefit of this approach is that the ECM is isolated, and that only energy flows associated with the ECM itself are considered.

This method is described as Option A or Option B in the International Performance Measurement and Verification Protocol (IPMVP). Table 1 presents the different options. Option A requires some measurement and allows for estimations of some parameters. Option B requires measurement of all parameters. In both options, calculations are done (typically in spreadsheets) to determine energy savings. Option C uses utility bills to determine energy savings.

There are many situations where Option A or Option B (Metering and Calculating) is the best approach to measuring energy savings, however, some ESCOs insist upon only using Option A or Option B, when clearly Option C would be most appropriate. If the ESCO was a lighting contractor, then Option A should work in all cases. Spot measurements of fixtures before and after, agreed upon hours of operation, and simple calculations can be inserted into a spreadsheet that can calculate savings. The same spreadsheet can be used over and over. However, for ESCOs that offer a variety of different retrofits, it is necessary to be able to employ all options so that the best option can be selected for each individual job. Controls Retrofits, or retrofits to HVAC systems are typically excellent candidates for Option C.

After installing the energy conservation measures (ECMs), the savings created from the project must be determined. This process, termed Measurement and Verification (M&V), is frequently performed by the ESCO, but may also be performed by the customer or a third party. The International Performance Measurement and Verification Protocol (IPMVP) is the standard M&V guideline for determining actual savings created by an energy management program. Because savings are the absence of energy use, they cannot be directly measured. IPMVP provides 4 methods for using measurement to reliably determine actual savings. A plan for applying the most appropriate of the 4 general methods to a specific project is typically created and agreed upon by all parties before implementation of the ECMs.

IPMVP Option A – Retrofit Isolation: Key Parameter Measurement
Savings are determined by field measurement of the key performance parameter(s) which define the energy use of the ECM's affected system(s). Parameters not selected for field measurement are estimated.

IPMVP Option B – Retrofit Isolation: All Parameter Measurement
Savings are determined by field measurement of the energy use of the ECM-affected system.

IPMVP Option C – Whole Facility
Savings are determined by measuring energy use at the whole facility or sub-facility level.

IPMVP Option D – Calibrated Simulation
Savings are determined through simulation of the energy use of the facility, or of a sub-facility. The simulation model must be calibrated so that it predicts an energy pattern that approximately matches actual metered data.

Table 1 provides suggested IPMVP options for different project characteristics. For each project, an M&V approach which balances the uncertainty in achieved savings and the cost of the M&V plan should be selected. Some plans include only short term verification approaches and others include repeated measurements for an extended period. Because the expense of determining the amount of savings achieved erodes the benefit of the savings themselves, IPMVP suggests not spending more than 10% of the expected savings on M&V. Often M&V approaches are bundled with other monitoring, support, or maintenance services that help achieve or ensure the savings performance. These costs should not be considered M&V expenses and depending on the project and services details, may greatly exceed 10% of the savings.

Utilizing the savings
 Once the project is completed the immediate results of energy savings (often between 15 and 35 percent), and the long term maintenance costs can be put towards the capital investment of upgrading the energy system. This is often how ESCOs and performance contracts work.  The initial implementation is done, in a sense, free of charge, with the payment coming from the percentage of the energy savings collected by a financing company or the ESCO.  The client may also wish to use some capital investment money to lower that percentage during the payback period. The payback period can range from five to twenty years, depending on the negotiated contract.  Most state or federally funded projects have a max payback of 15 years.  Once the equipment and project have been paid for, the client may be entitled to the full amount of savings to use at their will.  It is also common to see large capital improvements financed through energy savings projects.  Upgrades to the mechanical/electrical system, new building envelope components, or even restorations and retrofits may be included in the contract even though they have no effect on the amount of energy savings.  By utilizing the energy savings, the client may be able to put the funds once used to pay for energy towards the capital improvement that would otherwise be unfeasible with the currently allotted funding.

U. S. Federal Program: "Super-ESPC"
Since its creation in the 1990s, a single U. S. government program known as "Super-ESPC" (ESPC stands for Energy Savings Performance Contracts) has been responsible for $2.9B in ESCO contracts. The program was modified and reauthorized in December 2008, and sixteen firms were awarded Indefinite delivery/indefinite quantity (IDIQ) contracts for up to $5B each, for total potential energy-savings projects worth $80B.

Grouping the sixteen firms provides a convenient illustration of the industry structure and the ways that each firm generates value through projects that use the ESCO model of energy-savings performance contracts. Equipment-affiliated firms use performance contracting as a sales channel for their products. Utility-affiliated firms offer ESCO projects as a value-added service to attract and retain large customers and generally focus only on their utility footprint. Non-utility energy services companies are product neutral, tend to have a larger geographic footprint, and typically offer a wide range of services from energy retrofits to renewable energy development.

Equipment affiliated
NORESCO (Carrier) 
Honeywell Building Solutions SES
Johnson Controls Government Systems, L.L.C. (York)
Schneider Electric
Siemens Government Services, Inc.
Trane

Utility affiliated
ConEdison
Constellation
FPL Energy Services
Pepco Energy Services
Energy Systems Group

Non-utility energy services
Ameresco (Ennovate, Exelon Services Federal Group, E3, APS...Acquired)
The Benham Companies, LLC (SAIC Acquired)
CEG Solutions LLC (formerly Clark Energy Group LLC)
Lockheed Martin Services, Inc.
McKinstry
Brewer Garrett

ESCO 2.0
In June 2005, the GAO released a report, “Energy Savings: Performance Contracts Offer Benefits, But Vigilance Is Needed To Protect Government Interests.” The Office of the Under Secretary of Defense for Technology, Acquisition, and Logistics agreed with the GAO findings. “While these complicated contracts are structured to ensure that savings will exceed costs,” the DOD noted, “we recognize that our measurement and verification procedures must be improved to confirm estimates with actual data.” Unverified savings, often stipulated rather than proven, do not put more oil in the ground, take CO2 out of the air or reduce operating budgets

The GAO ESPC study brings into question whether or not there is sufficient data to prove that the gains delivered by ESCOs are sustainable over time. The study further questions the practice of having ESCOs monitoring and validating the performance of their own projects.

In fact, most buildings and facilities exhibit the same basic limitations with respect to energy conservation and optimum maintenance. US Federal studies show that major and minor building systems routinely fail to meet performance expectations, and these faults often go unnoticed over time. The functions of a building, the number of tenants, and the configuration of the space change over time in unanticipated manners that adversely affect the systems that control building performance.

Surprisingly, almost all buildings, building complexes, and systems inside buildings still operate in a disconnected, stand-alone manner. Proprietary systems result in buildings that needlessly waste energy.  Recent studies have found that roughly 30% of LEED certified buildings perform substantially better than anticipated, while 25% perform substantially worse than anticipated.  In general, LEED certified buildings perform 25-30% better than non-LEED certified buildings with regards to energy use.  It is ultimately difficult or impossible for customers to construct a single integrated picture that correlates energy usage and maintenance costs to control system performance, space usage, conservation measures, and the behavior of those using the facility space.

A more recent phenomenon is the concept of combining the benefits of performance contracting with the benefits of green buildings, affectionately described as green performance contracting.  The reason the concept makes sense is because for green buildings, the costliest prerequisites to meet are usually the energy efficiency requirements.  The LEED rating system requires buildings to be benchmarked using the EPA EnergyStar system.  The minimum score to meet the LEED prerequisites is a score of 75 or greater (meaning the building is in the top 75 percentile of benchmarked buildings).  Since performance contracting attempts to find all the sources of energy waste, then a building that has gone through the performance contracting process should meet the LEED prerequisite.

Green performance contracting can be used to achieve sustainability goals in new building design and construction as well as in existing buildings.
New Buildings: Higher-efficiency choices are compared to the modeled performance of the as-designed less-efficient building. Applying performance contracting to buildings being designed and built is the perfect cure for pressure to “value engineer” the efficiency and sustainability out of new buildings as they are designed. In new buildings, performance contracting bridges the gap between the first-cost and life-cycle-cost perspectives by using long-term energy savings to pay for the incremental first-cost of high-efficiency measures.

Existing buildings: Green performance contracting provides a mechanism for implementing and financing the building's efficiency and sustainability upgrades, including improved operations.  Achieving sustainable building performance in existing buildings can be done at reasonable costs. If needed, system or building upgrades can be spread out over time and implemented when capital dollars become available.

Green performance contracting provides comprehensive integrated solutions to a wide variety of building, site and infrastructure improvements, and it allows building owners to pay for these building sustainability improvements, including capital improvements or renewable energy, with funds in the organization's expense budget.

The result is a better performing building along with all the public relations and marketing benefits of green buildings.

Retro-commissioning
Studies show that virtually every building suffers from incompletely installed controls systems, excessive chilling and heating capacity, and an inability to obtain the data needed to let senior decision makers understand how a building is really performing. The National Institute of Standards and Technology (NIST) found that an average building lasts only two-thirds of its forecast life before it needs to be replaced or substantially retrofitted. Often the explanation for this cluster of problems is incomplete or improper building commissioning at the beginning of the building's life cycle. (Building commissioning is the start-up process by which every new building's systems are initially configured and calibrated to its occupancy loads to get it up and running.)

According to NIST, the time needed to do building commissioning right is rarely available, defects and opportunities are overlooked, and system potential goes unrealized. Over time equipment performance and control sequences naturally degrade, and substandard performance or even failures of systems and components go unrecognized. The ultimate result is almost universal waste of various kinds, including substantial energy and maintenance cost.

Independent Measurement and Verification
Few, if any, of these factors are addressable by the Energy Services Companies or through ESPCs because the information needed to define the real problems is not captured. There is a clear need for integrated solutions that offer the kind of accountability and transparency — and plenty of the “actual data” — that is currently lacking in the ESPC process. What is needed in fact is an independent means of continuously monitoring performance so that buildings reach peak performance sooner and maintain peak performance over time (as represented by the yellow field in the figure) despite changes in use, maintenance, energy cost, and user behavior.

Key components of ESCO 2.0
Real-time integration and visibility of building management systems, metering subsystems, and asset management applications.
Automated, real-time analysis and reporting of key performance indicators associated with subsystem operations, energy use, and equipment maintenance management.
Recommendations for results-oriented energy usage and maintenance program refinements that will enable energy reduction targets to be met or exceeded.
On-going monitoring of subsystems to continually expand energy conservation efforts and maintenance management improvements for further cost reductions.
Independent verification of ESCO and other Energy Conservation Measures (ECM) programs.
US Federal reporting into OMB Scorecard

UK and European based ESCOs
A number of firms have started offering ESCO services in Europe.  As in the US, some belong to utilities, some belong to manufacturers and others are independent.

See also
 Efficient energy use
 Industrial Assessment Center
 RESCO – renewable energy service company

References

External links
 AssoESCo - Associazione italiana delle Energy Service Company e degli Operatori dell'Efficienza Energetica
 ESCO Europe conference, 20-21, Milan, Italy
 New York Times, Sept 1, 2008 Ambit and other ESCOs for consumers

Energy companies
Energy conservation